KWTU (89.7 MHz) is a non-commercial FM radio station in Tulsa, Oklahoma.  It airs a classical music radio format, mostly from American Public Media's Classical 24, a nationally syndicated music service.  KWTU is owned and operated by The University of Tulsa which also owns sister station 89.5 KWGS, an NPR news and information outlet.  At night and on weekends, KWTU carries shows such as NPR's Performance Today and from orchestras including the New York Philharmonic and Chicago Symphony Orchestra.

KWTU has an effective radiated power (ERP) of 5,000 watts.  The transmitter is co-located with the tower for KOTV-DT, on South 273rd East Avenue near the Muskogee Turnpike in Broken Arrow.   It is a Class C2 FM radio station. It is licensed by the U.S. Federal Communications Commission to broadcast using HD Radio technology.  The HD-2 digital subchannel plays music from the Great American Songbook.

History
On , KWTU first signed on the air.  Tulsa Public Radio's KWGS 89.3 FM had a schedule of mostly news and information, with some classical programming.  Management wanted to create an all-classical station for music fans and allow KWGS to air a full time news and info schedule.

According to the Tulsa World newspaper, 88.7 MHz was the last open frequency on the FM dial in Tulsa.  Because 88.7 and adjacent frequencies already had stations nearby, KWTU's 5,000 watt signal was the maximum allowed by the FCC.  By contrast, KWGS is powered at 50,000 watts and some Tulsa stations run 100,000 watts.

External links
KWTU's website

References

WTU
Classical music radio stations in the United States
University of Tulsa
NPR member stations
2004 establishments in Oklahoma